The Key West Butterfly and Nature Conservatory located at 1316 Duval Street, Key West, Florida, United States is a butterfly park that houses from 50 to 60 different species of live butterflies from around the world in a climate-controlled, glass-enclosed habitat.

The conservatory includes flowering plants, cascading waterfalls and trees.  There are also several species of free flying "butterfly friendly" birds, such as American flamingoes, red-factor canaries, zebra finches, cordon-bleu finches and "button" or Chinese painted quail.

There is a learning center where guests can get a close up view of a variety of live caterpillars feeding and developing on their host plants.

See also
Southernmost point buoy (The marker and the cable hut are South)

References

External links

Photo gallery

Butterfly
Butterfly
Butterfly houses
Gardens in Florida
Butterfly
Zoos in Florida
Parks in Monroe County, Florida